Cabrerizos is a village and municipality in the province of Salamanca,  western Spain, part of the autonomous community of Castile-Leon. It is located only  from the city of Salamanca and has a population of 4205 people.

References

Municipalities in the Province of Salamanca